34th Street–Penn Station is an express station on the IRT Broadway–Seventh Avenue Line of the New York City Subway. Located at the intersection of 34th Street and Seventh Avenue, it is served by the 1 and 2 trains at all times, and the 3 train at all times except late nights. Connections are available to the LIRR, NJ Transit and Amtrak at Pennsylvania Station.

The station was built by the Interborough Rapid Transit Company (IRT) as part of the Dual Contracts with New York City, and opened on June 3, 1917.

History

Construction and opening

The Dual Contracts, which were signed on March 19, 1913, were contracts for the construction, rehabilitation and operation of rapid transit lines in the City of New York. The contracts were "dual" in that they were signed between the city and two separate private companies, the Interborough Rapid Transit Company (IRT) and the Brooklyn Rapid Transit Company (BRT), all working together to make the construction of the Dual Contracts possible. The Dual Contracts promised the construction of several lines in Brooklyn. As part of Contract 4, the IRT agreed to build a branch of the original subway line south down Seventh Avenue, Varick Street, and West Broadway to serve the West Side of Manhattan.

The construction of this line, in conjunction with the construction of the Lexington Avenue Line, would change the operations of the IRT system. Instead of having trains go via Broadway, turning onto 42nd Street, before finally turning onto Park Avenue, there would be two trunk lines connected by the 42nd Street Shuttle. The system would be changed from looking like a "Z" system on a map to an "H" system. One trunk would run via the new Lexington Avenue Line down Park Avenue, and the other trunk would run via the new Seventh Avenue Line up Broadway. In order for the line to continue down Varick Street and West Broadway, these streets needed to be widened, and two new streets were built, the Seventh Avenue Extension and the Varick Street Extension. It was predicted that the subway extension would lead to the growth of the Lower West Side, and to neighborhoods such as Chelsea and Greenwich Village.

34th Street–Penn Station on the IRT Broadway–Seventh Avenue Line was opened on June 3, 1917, as part of an extension of the Interborough Rapid Transit Company, the dominant subway in Manhattan at the time, from Times Square–42nd Street to South Ferry. Concrete-laying for the platforms had started shortly before the station opened, and only the northern part of the express platform was in service on the station's opening day. The passageways to Pennsylvania Station were still under construction, forcing passengers to exit the subway station and walk along the street to access the railroad station. Once the passageways were complete, passengers could access both the railroad station and the neighboring Hotel Pennsylvania at 32nd and 33rd Streets without leaving the subway station. 

A shuttle service ran between Times Square and Penn Station until the rest of the extension opened a year later on July 1, 1918. Afterward, the shuttle ran from Times Square to South Ferry. The new "H" system was implemented on August 1, 1918, joining the two halves of the Broadway–Seventh Avenue Line and sending all West Side trains south from Times Square. An immediate result of the switch was the need to transfer using the 42nd Street Shuttle in order to retrace the original layout. The completion of the "H" system doubled the capacity of the IRT system.

Later years
The city government took over the IRT's operations on June 12, 1940. On August 23, 1985, the Metropolitan Transportation Authority (MTA) awarded a $2.24 million contract to rebuild the station and to double the width of the passageway to Penn Station. The project was scheduled to be completed in spring 1987.

Under the 2015–2019 MTA Capital Program, the station, along with thirty-two other New York City Subway stations, underwent a complete overhaul as part of the Enhanced Station Initiative. Updates included cellular service, Wi-Fi, charging stations, improved signage, and improved station lighting. Unlike other stations that were renovated under the initiative, 34th Street–Penn Station was not completely closed during construction. In January 2018, the NYCT and Bus Committee recommended that Judlau Contracting receive the $125 million contract for the renovations of 57th and 23rd Streets on the IND Sixth Avenue Line; 28th Street on the IRT Lexington Avenue Line, and 34th Street–Penn Station on the IRT Broadway–Seventh Avenue Line and IND Eighth Avenue Line. However, the MTA Board temporarily deferred the vote for these packages after city representatives refused to vote to award the contracts. The contract was put back for a vote in February, where it was ultimately approved. These improvements were substantially completed by May 2019.

The MTA announced in December 2021 that it would install wide-aisle fare gates for disabled passengers at five subway stations, including 34th Street–Penn Station, by mid-2022. The implementation of these fare gates was delayed; none of the wide-aisle fare gates had been installed by early 2023.

Station layout

Like 34th Street–Penn Station on the IND Eighth Avenue Line and Atlantic Avenue–Barclays Center on the IRT Eastern Parkway Line, this station has two side platforms for local service and a center island platform for express service. This is due to the expected increase in ridership and to encourage riders to switch at the next stop northbound, Times Square–42nd Street, as it is set up in the usual island platform manner for cross-platform interchanges.

There is no free transfer between this station and the station of the same name on the IND Eighth Avenue Line, despite the fact that both connect to Penn Station. The nearest transfer location is at Times Square–42nd Street with a free transfer to 42nd Street–Port Authority Bus Terminal.

Exits

34th Street–Penn Station spans three streets (32nd, 33rd, and 34th Streets) with a set of entrances/exits at all of these streets. For the purposes of this article, entrance and exit are interchangeable.

There are four entrances directly from the intersection of 34th Street and Seventh Avenue. On the local platforms the turnstiles for these exits are at platform level; passengers wishing to use the express platforms must use a passageway beneath the platforms and tracks. These entrances utilize the northern portions of the platforms. There is also a supplementary and handicapped-accessible entrance to the Penn Station complex in general from 34th Street.

There are three direct entrances from the street at 33rd Street and Seventh Avenue. As a replacement for the southwestern corner's lack of an entrance, there is an underground entrance directly connecting the station with the Long Island Rail Road concourse in the Penn Station complex. The turnstiles for this entrance are located below the track level and utilize the central portions of the platforms.

The main entrance to the Penn Station complex is located on the western end of 32nd Street. From there, passengers may go through the New Jersey Transit and Long Island Rail Road concourses and use the entrance to this station at the end of the latter's concourse. There is also a smaller exit from the station at the southern ends of the platforms that connects with the end of the New Jersey Transit concourse where it meets the Long Island Rail Road underneath the main corridor in the station that connects New Jersey Transit and Amtrak. There is also an entrance on the north side of 32nd Street between Seventh and Sixth Avenues.

Ridership
34th Street–Penn Station on the Broadway–Seventh Avenue Line is continually ranked as one of the busiest stations in the subway system. In 2016, it was the fifth-busiest subway station, with 27,741,367 riders as recorded by the Metropolitan Transportation Authority. By comparison, its sister station on the Eighth Avenue Line is ranked sixth-busiest, with 25,183,869 passengers. When the Broadway–Seventh Avenue Line station was a shuttle stop before the rest of the South Ferry extension opened, ridership was quite low; in its first year of operation, only 78,121 boardings were recorded.

References

External links

1918 establishments in New York City
IRT Broadway–Seventh Avenue Line stations
Midtown Manhattan
34th Street - Penn Station (IRT Broadway-Seventh Avenue Line)
Railway stations in the United States opened in 1918
Seventh Avenue (Manhattan)
34th Street (Manhattan)